The 1923 NFL season was the fourth regular season of the National Football League. For the first time, all of the clubs that were considered to be part of the NFL fielded teams. The new teams that entered the league were the Duluth Kelleys, the St. Louis All Stars (which only lasted one season), and a new Cleveland Indians team, while the Evansville Crimson Giants dropped out of the league and folded. The Canton Bulldogs repeated as NFL Champions after ending the season with an 11–0–1 record.

Postseason play
Six days after the December 9 end of the NFL season, league champion Canton accepted a challenge to play against the Frankford Yellow Jackets of Philadelphia, who were not an NFL team but who had billed themselves as "champions of the East" with a 9-1-2 record against teams in the "Anthracite League" and against four other NFL teams. Canton won the game in Philadelphia in the final two minutes of play on a field goal from future Hall of Famer Pete Henry.

Teams
Twenty teams competed in the NFL during the 1923 season.

Standings

References

 NFL Record and Fact Book
 NFL History 1921–1930 (Last accessed December 4, 2005)
 Total Football: The Official Encyclopedia of the National Football League

1923